The Stillbirth and Neonatal Death Charity  (Sands) is a national charity in the United Kingdom that provides support to anyone affected by the death of a baby.

It is based at the Royal College of Obstetricians and Gynaecologists in London and is a registered charity.

Activities
Its activities include:
 offering support via meetings, telephone and email for bereaved parents and women who are pregnant again or thinking of having another baby
 training for hospitals and other healthcare providers to ensure bereaved parents receive adequate and appropriate care and support
 conveying information about stillbirth and neonatal death through publications and its website
 promoting research to reduce the loss of babies' lives.

Sands Freephone Helpline

In March 2017 the Sands Helpline number changed to  0808 164 3332. The number is free to call from landlines and mobiles.

Sands Garden

The Stillbirth and Neonatal Death Charity Garden is a feature within the National Memorial Arboretum, the UK national site of remembrance at Alrewas, near Lichfield in Staffordshire.

See also
 Perinatal mortality
 Stillbirth Foundation Australia
 Still Aware
 Abigail's Footsteps
 Baby Loss Awareness Week

References

External links 
 Stillbirth and Neonatal Death Charity website

Charities based in England
Stillbirth organizations
Health in the City of Westminster
Medical and health organisations based in the United Kingdom
Obstetrics and gynaecology organizations
Organisations based in the City of Westminster